= Constituency PSW-155 =

Reserved constituency of the Provincial Assembly of Sindh, Pakistan

PSW-155 is a constituency reserved for a female in the Provincial Assembly of Sindh.

== See also ==
- Sindh
